"Wait (The Whisper Song)" is a 2005 snap song released by Atlanta crunk rap duo Ying Yang Twins off their album U.S.A. (United State of Atlanta). The song consists of a minimal bass pulse, a few finger-snaps, and whispered, sexually explicit lyrics. The song's unique sound was mixed by Atlanta sound engineer Joel Mullis, who is currently affiliated with the production company 340 Music. "Wait" became a hit single, reaching No. 15 on the Billboard Hot 100.

Content
The song interprets a man whispering sexually explicit messages into a woman's ear, with her becoming sexually turned on.

The song was parodied by The Lonely Island's Akiva Schaffer and Jorma Taccone on Saturday Night Live in a sketch titled "Bing Bong Brothers".

Sarah and Naomi from the R&B group Electrik Red are seen in the music video.

The official remix version of the song features Lil Scrappy, Busta Rhymes, Missy Elliott and Free.

Future Big Brother houseguest Brittany Martinez appears in the video.

In 2022, American R&B singer Bryson Tiller sampled the song for his single "Outside". The Ying Yang Twins appeared in the music video to the song.

Track listing

Charts

Weekly charts

Year-end charts

References

2005 songs
2005 singles
Music videos directed by Director X
Ying Yang Twins songs
TVT Records singles
Dirty rap songs
Songs written by Mr. Collipark